Johannes Hartlieb (c. 1410 – 18 May 1468) was a physician of Late Medieval Bavaria, probably of a family from Neuburg an der Donau. He was in the employment of Louis VII of Bavaria and Albert VI of Austria in the 1430s,  and of Albert III of Bavaria from 1440, and of the latter's son Sigismund from 1456. 
In 1444, he married Sibilla, possibly the daughter of Albert and Agnes Bernauer.
Hartlieb wrote a compendium on herbs in ca. 1440, and in 1456 the puch aller verpoten kunst, ungelaubens und der zaubrey (book on all forbidden arts, superstition and sorcery) on the artes magicae, containing the oldest known description of witches' flying ointment.
Hartlieb also produced German translations of various classical and medieval authors (Trotula, Macrobius, Gilbertinus, Muscio).

Works 
onomancy (18 mss., Heidelberger Schicksalsbuch CPG 832, CPG 408)
das puch aller verpoten kunst, ungelaubens und der zaubrey, 1450s, CPG 478, 78 foll. (in the hand of Clara Hätzlerin), 1465, ed. Eisermann and Graf (1989).
Kräuterbuch (herbology), ed. Speta, Graz (1980).
Chiromantia, 1448, printed as a Woodblock print in the 1470s, ed. Weil, München (1923).
translation of Trotula and de secretis mulierum, 1450s, CPG 480 ed. Bosselmann, Würzburg (1985).
translation of Caesarius von Heisterbach's dialogus miraculorum, ed. 1929.
sand Brandons buch (the journey of Saint Brendan), printed by Anton Sorg, Augsburg, ca. 1480.
'de amore' deutsch, translation of Andreas Capellanus'  de amore, ed. Karnein, München (1970), Berlin (1979).
Alexander Magnus,  translation of the Alexander Romance, 1444, printed by Anton Sorg, Augsburg (1480), Martin Schott, Strassburg (1488).
De mansionibus, CPG 6

References

Allgemeine Deutsche Biographie vol. 10,  670ff.
F. Fürbeth, Johannes Hartlieb, Untersuchungen zu Leben und Werk, Niemeyer, Tübingen (1992).
W. Schmitt, Hans Hartliebs mantische Schriften und seine Beeinflussung durch Nikolaus von Kues, Diss. Heidelberg (1962).
Gerold Hayer und Bernhard Schnell (Hg.), Johannes Hartlieb, 'Kräuterbuch'. Zum ersten Mal kritisch hg. (Wissensliteratur im Mittelalter 47), Wiesbaden 2010. 

German occult writers
German science writers
German medical writers
German translators
1400s births
1468 deaths
German people of the Renaissance period
15th-century German writers
15th-century German physicians
Physicians from Bavaria
15th-century translators